Anna-Lisa Baude (25 September 1897 – 7 June 1968) was a Swedish film actress. She appeared in 60 films between 1921 and 1968.

Selected filmography

 The Girl in Tails (1926)
Hotel Paradis (1931)
 Colourful Pages (1931)
 Tired Theodore (1931)
 The Love Express (1932)
 A Stolen Waltz (1932)
 Two Men and a Widow (1933)
 Melody of the Sea (1934)
 The Marriage Game (1935)
 Emilie Högquist (1939)
 Variety Is the Spice of Life (1939)
 The Crazy Family (1940)
 The Bjorck Family (1940)
 We're All Errand Boys (1941)
 How to Tame a Real Man (1941)
 In Paradise (1941)
Lucky Young Lady (1941)
 We House Slaves (1942)
 Captured by a Voice (1943)
 Little Napoleon (1943)
 My People Are Not Yours (1944)
 Oss tjuvar emellan eller En burk ananas (1945)
 Motherhood (1945)
 Crisis (1946)
 Affairs of a Model (1946)
 Carnival Evening (1948)
 Love Wins Out (1949)
 My Sister and I (1950)
Living on 'Hope' (1951)
 In Lilac Time (1952)
 Sju svarta be-hå (1954)
 Rätten att älska (1956)
 The Biscuit (1956)

References

External links

1897 births
1968 deaths
Swedish film actresses
Swedish silent film actresses
Actresses from Stockholm
20th-century Swedish actresses